Monotocheirodon pearsoni is a species of characin endemic to Bolivia where it occurs in the Rio Beni basin.

References

Characidae
Fish of South America
Fish of Bolivia
Endemic fauna of Bolivia
Fish described in 1924